According to the Hebrew Bible, Phinehas or Phineas (Phinees) was a priest during the Israelites’ Exodus journey. The grandson of Aaron and son of Eleazar, the High Priests, he distinguished himself as a youth at Shittim with his zeal against the heresy of Peor. 

Displeased with the immorality with which the Moabites and Midianites had successfully tempted the Israelites to inter-marry and to worship Baal-peor, Phinehas personally executed an Israelite man and a Midianite woman while they were together in the man's tent, running a javelin or spear through the man and the belly of the woman, bringing to an end the plague sent by God to punish the Israelites for sexually intermingling with the Midianites.

After the entry to the land of Israel and the death of his father, he was appointed the third High Priest of Israel, and served at the sanctuary of Bethel.

Name
The name "Phinehas" probably comes from the Egyptian name Pa-nehasi (pꜣ-nḥsj). According to the Oxford Companion to the Bible, "the Bible also uses Egyptian and Nubian names for the land and its people ... For the Egyptians used to these color variations, the term for their southern neighbors was Neḥesi, 'southerner', which eventually also came to mean 'the black' or 'the Nubian'. This Egyptian root (nḥsj, with the preformative pʾ as a definite article) appears in Exodus 6.25 as the personal name of Aaron's grandson, Phinehas (= Pa-neḥas)". The Theological Wordbook of the Old Testament interprets the name to mean "the bronze-colored one".

Heresy of Peor

The account appears immediately after the story of Balaam, who had been hired by the Moabite chieftain, Balak, to curse the Israelites. Balaam failed to do so, as God had put words in his mouth of blessing for Israel, instead (the first prayer said by Jews as part of their daily prayer service comes from this exact text). Having failed to curse them, Balaam left for his own country.

Moses gave orders to kill all the idolaters, yet Zimri, the son of the Israelite prince Salu from the Tribe of Simeon, openly defied Moses and publicly showed his opinion to those standing at the Tabernacle entrance with Moses by going in to Cozbi, the daughter of the Midianite prince Sur. In a moment of great strength born of holy zeal, Phinehas went after them and ran them through with a spear. He thus "stayed the plague" that had broken out among the people, and by which twenty-four thousand of them had already perished. 

God noticed that Phinehas showed loyalty and bravery for God. God decided not to destroy all of the children of Israel in anger because Phinehas had made atonement for their sins. God declared that Phinehas, and his sons' sons for all eternity, would receive divine recognition for this; a covenant of peace and the covenant of an everlasting hereditary priesthood.

The Christian book of Revelation mirrors this sentiment. Revelation describes Jesus as speaking to one of seven Christian churches: "Nevertheless, I have a few things against you: You have people there who hold to the teaching of Balaam, who taught Balak to entice the Israelites to sin by eating food sacrificed to idols and by committing sexual immorality."

Giving a more elaborated version of events, the 1st-century Romano-Jewish historian Flavius Josephus asserts that Balaam sent for Balak and the princes of Midian and told them that, if they wished to bring evil upon Israel, they would have to make the Israelites sin. Balaam advised that they send the most beautiful women to seduce the Israelites to idolatry. This strategy succeeded, and soon many of the Israelites had been seduced.

Later activities

Phinehas later led a 12,000-strong Israelite army against the Midianites to avenge this occasion. Among those slain in the expedition were five Midianite kings, Evi, Rekem, Zur, Hur, and Reba, and also Balaam, son of Beor. According to the Israelite roll-calls, the Israelites did not lose a man in the expedition.

Phinehas son of Eleazar appears again in the book of Joshua. When the tribes of Reuben and Gad, together with the half-tribe of Manasseh, depart to take possession of their lands beyond the Jordan, they build a great altar on the other side; the remainder of the Israelites mistake this for a separatist move to set up a new religious centre, and send Phinehas to investigate.

In addition to these episodes, Phinehas appears as the chief adviser in the war with the Benjamites. He is commemorated in .According to some rabbinical commentators, Phineas sinned due to his not availing his servitude of Torah instruction to the masses at the time leading up to the Battle of Gibeah. In addition, he also failed to address the needs of relieving Jephthah of his vow to sacrifice his daughter. As consequence, the high priesthood was taken from him and temporarily given to the offspring of Ithamar, essentially Eli and his sons.

According to 1 Maccabees, he is an ancestor of Matitiyahu.

In Jewish culture
Pinechas is the name of the 41st weekly Parashah or portion in the annual Jewish cycle of Torah reading and the eighth in the book of Numbers. The beginning of this parashah tells the judgement of Phinehas son of Eleazar; the end of the previous parashah tells of his zealous act.

The Hebrew expression "One who acts like Zimri and asks for a reward as if he were Phinehas" refers to hypocrites who ask for undeserved rewards and honors. It derives from the Babylonian Talmud (Sotah, Ch.22, p. 2), where it is attributed to the Hasmonean King Alexander Jannaeus (see Hebrew Wikipedia ).

In some traditions (for example in the Targum Pseudo-Jonathan) Phinehas is identified with Elijah. This identification apparently arose during the first century A.D.

Veneration 

The Catholic Church commemorates him as a saint on 1 July and 1 March.
The Eastern Orthodox Church commemorates him as a saint on 12 March and 25 March.

Patrilineal ancestry

References

Sources

External links
 "Phinehas" at Jewish Encyclopedia

High Priests of Israel
Book of Numbers people
Christian saints from the Old Testament
Midian
Biblical murderers
Christian saints in unknown century
Military saints
Saints from the Holy Land